Begaye is a surname, derived from the Navajo word biyeʼ  meaning "his/her son". Notable people with the surname include:

Enei Begaye, American activist
Fleming Begaye Sr. (1921–2019), Navajo code talker
Kelsey Begaye (1951–2021), American politician 
Nathan Begaye (1969–2010), Native American ceramics artist 
Ray Begaye (born 1954), American politician
Russell Begaye, American politician

See also
 Begay

Native American surnames
Navajo language